West St. Paul can refer to:

 West St. Paul, Manitoba, Canada
 West St. Paul, Minnesota, United States